Hip hip hooray is a cheer called out to express congratulation.

Hip Hip Hurray or similar may also refer to:

Film and television
Hip Hip Hurray (TV series), a 1998–2001 Indian TV series 
Hip Hip Hurray (film), a 1984 Hindi film
Hip Hip Hurrah! (film), a 1987 Danish-Norwegian-Swedish drama film
Hip Hip-Hurry!, a 1958 Warner Bros. Merrie Melodies animated short film
Hip Hip Hora!, known as The Ketchup Effect in most English-speaking countries, a 2004 Swedish teen movie
Hip-Hip and Hurra, a 2011-2013 Polish animated TV series

Music
"Hip Hip Hooray" (Sneaky Sound System song), 2004
Hip Hip Hooray, a children's album from Play School (Australian TV series)
Hip Hip Hura, a 1985 album by Chrisye
"Hip Hip Hooray", a 2016 song by Dappy
"Hip Hop Hooray", a 1992 song by Naughty by Nature

Other uses
Hip, Hip, Hurrah!, an 1888 painting by Peder Severin Krøyer

See also

Hooray (disambiguation)
Huzzah